Jakub Ojrzyński (born 19 February 2003) is a Polish professional footballer who plays as a goalkeeper for Premier League side Liverpool.

Career
Liverpool signed Ojrzyński from Legia Warsaw in summer 2019 for £200,000; he travelled with the first team for their preseason tour of the USA that summer, before linking up with Liverpool's Under 18s and Under 23s teams.

Ojrzyński was on the bench for Liverpool's 2–0 Premier League victory over Sheffield United in February 2021. He signed a new contract with Liverpool in July of that year, before joining Caernarfon Town on loan for the 2021–22 season. Throughout his loan spell, he continued training at Liverpool's Kirkby training complex regularly throughout the season.

On 22 June 2022, he joined Radomiak Radom on loan for the duration of the 2022–23 season. He was recalled on 17 January 2023 after completing 3 first-team appearances for the Polish side.

Personal life
He is the son of football manager Leszek Ojrzyński.

References 

2003 births
Living people
People from Warsaw
Sportspeople from Warsaw
Association football goalkeepers
Polish footballers
Poland youth international footballers
Polish expatriate footballers
Liverpool F.C. players
Caernarfon Town F.C. players
Radomiak Radom players
Cymru Premier players
Ekstraklasa players
Polish expatriate sportspeople in England
Polish expatriate sportspeople in Wales
Expatriate footballers in England
Expatriate footballers in Wales